Melbourne railway station may refer to:

Australia
 Flinders Street railway station, the main station of Melbourne's suburban railway network
 Melbourne Central railway station, a station on Melbourne's suburban network
 North Melbourne railway station, a railway station in West Melbourne, Victoria
 Southern Cross railway station, terminus of Victoria's regional railway network

United Kingdom
 Melbourne railway station (United Kingdom)

See also
 List of railway stations in Melbourne
 Medbourne railway station, a station in Medbourne, Leicestershire, England